Jamie's Comfort Food is a UK food lifestyle programme which was broadcast on Channel 4 in 2014. In each half-hour episode, Jamie Oliver creates three 'comfort food' dishes including snacks, mains and desserts. A tie-in book of recipes was released in September 2014.

Episodes

External links
 

Channel 4 original programming
British cooking television shows
2014 British television series debuts
2014 British television series endings
English-language television shows